Warwick Senators is an NBL1 West club based in Perth, Western Australia. The club fields a team in both the Men's and Women's NBL1 West. The club is a division of Stirling Basketball Association (SBA), the major administrative basketball organisation in the City of Stirling. The SBA was established in 1971, and in 2012, came under the umbrella of the Churches of Christ Sport & Recreation Association (CCSRA). The Senators play their home games at Warwick Stadium.

Club history

Background
The creation of Stirling Basketball Association began in the late 1960s when a group of 15–17-year-old boys from the Tuart Hill Junior Basketball Club formed a new club because there was no clear pathway for them to continue their basketball careers in the Western Australian Senior District Basketball Competition. Introduced to the sport of basketball at Tuart Hill High School, the boys dominated the state's junior competitions through the 1960s and provided the bulk of the Western Australian junior state team representatives. At that time, Tuart Hill was a feeder club for the Perth Basketball Club, the leading senior club in Western Australian basketball. Limited selection meant that many boys would be left with the prospect of not having a senior career in basketball after dominating the sport in junior ranks. Led by Alan Simmonds, a number of boys from Tuart Hill approached the state association and proposed that a new district association be formed called the Stirling Basketball Association. The Stirling proposal was based on the incorporation of the Tuart Hill Boys and Norths Girls junior basketball clubs. The proposal was accepted and Stirling Basketball Association was formed in 1971, providing a pathway for all Tuart Hill boys and Norths girls basketball players to enter the Western Australian Basketball Association senior competitions under the Stirling name.

Nicknamed the Senators, the inaugural Stirling 'A' Grade District men's team competed for the first time in the 1972 season. While Simmonds became the first Club President and team captain, Colin James from New South Wales became the team's first head coach. In just their third season, the Senators men reached their first ever grand final, where they lost 80–67 to Swan Districts. The following year, the team again made the grand final, this time winning 69–68 over Perth to claim their maiden premiership. Between 1974 and 1987, the Senators men competed in 10 A-Grade grand finals, where they won four premierships (1975, 1978, 1981 and 1982). Furthermore, the Senators women were also a force in the District Competition, as they won the inaugural women's A-Grade premiership in 1974 before competing in grand finals in 1977, 1981, 1982, 1984, 1985, 1987 and 1988, winning five titles (1974, 1981, 1984, 1985 and 1988).

1978 proved a milestone year as the club was selected to represent Western Australia in the National Australian Club Championships. This competition was a precursor to the NBL. At the 1978 Australian Club Championships in Adelaide, the Senators were the surprise team of the championships. While expected to lose early in the qualifying rounds, the team reached the final to become the first Western Australian team to do so. There they lost to the highly-credentialed Nunawading Spectres led by Bill Palmer and Alan Black, despite leading by a point at half time.

SBL, NBL1 West

Early years and success
1989 saw the formation of the State Basketball League (SBL) with both a men's and women's competition. Stirling, trading as the Senators, entered a team into both the Men's SBL and Women's SBL. In 1990, the men's team earned a seventh-place finish with a 13–13 record before reaching the MSBL Grand Final, while the women's team claimed the minor premiership with a first-place finish a 20–4 record, before too reaching the WSBL Grand Final. Both teams however fell short, with the men losing 114–91 to the Perth Redbacks and the women losing 70–67 to the Wanneroo Wolves.

In 1993, the Senators women returned to the WSBL Grand Final, where they lost 68–51 to the Swan City Mustangs. In 1994, the women played in their third WSBL Grand Final, this time winning their maiden championship behind a 72–59 win over the Perry Lakes Hawks.

Success eluding the club
Success eluded the Senators throughout the 2000s and 2010s. Season 2007 marked a rare successful year for the club, as the women's team won their second minor premiership with a 20–2 record before reaching their fourth WSBL Grand Final. There they faced the Perry Lakes Hawks, where they were defeated 66–40.

Rebrand
In January 2019, the club rebranded as the Warwick Senators. In August 2019, the Senators women reached their first WSBL Grand Final since 2007, where they lost 85–56 to the Rockingham Flames.

In 2020, the men's team finished as minor premiers in the amateur-based West Coast Classic. They reached the grand final, where they defeated the Perry Lakes Hawks 96–81. It marked the men's team's first ever title.

In 2021, the SBL was rebranded as NBL1 West.

In 2022, the women's team finished as minor premiers with an 18–2 record and reached the NBL1 West Grand Final, where they defeated the Willetton Tigers 87–61 to win their first championship in 28 years. At the NBL1 National Finals, the Senators were crowned national champions with an 83–75 win over the Ringwood Hawks in the championship game.

Notable club figures

In July 2014, club legend and Perth Wildcats great Mike Ellis was honoured with his No. 6 jersey being retired. Ellis began playing for Stirling in 1974 at the age of 17, and was in the club's first premiership team the following year. In the early 1980s, Ellis averaged over 30 points a game for five consecutive seasons and throughout his NBL career with the Perth Wildcats, he continued to play with the Senators. After his retirement from the Wildcats, Ellis continued to play with the Senators until 1998. Since retirement, Ellis has continued to be a key figure in the life of the club, contributing on every level from coaching junior and SBL teams to playing key leadership roles.

In July 2018, one of the club's all-time best players, Carmie Olowoyo, had his No. 42 jersey retired by the Senators. Olowoyo played over 260 games for the Senators, beginning his career in 1995 before ending his career in 2010.

Accolades
Women
Championships: 2 (1994, 2022)
Grand Final appearances: 6 (1990, 1993, 1994, 2007, 2019, 2022)
Minor premierships: 3 (1990, 2007, 2022)

Men
Championships: Nil
Grand Final appearances: 1 (1990)
Minor premierships: Nil

References

External links
Official website

Basketball teams established in 1989
1989 establishments in Australia
Basketball teams in Western Australia
NBL1 West teams